Carol Iannone is a conservative writer and literary critic. She first made her mark as a strong critic of feminism in articles such as "The Barbarism of Feminist Scholarship." She has published extensively in Commentary, National Review, First Things, Modern Age, The American Conservative, Academic Questions, and other conservative and neoconservative publications.

Career
She is the founding Vice President of the National Association of Scholars, and an editor of Academic Questions, the quarterly publication of NAS. She is a regular contributor at the Phi Beta Cons blog at National Review Online.

In 1991 President George H. W. Bush nominated her to be on the board of the National Endowment for the Humanities, which was strongly opposed by officers of the Modern Language Association and other academics; they argued that she was not a distinguished scholar. She had virtually no record of publication in scholarly journals, and had never authored a scholarly book. The campaign against her, backed by many liberal academics and by Sen. Edward Kennedy, succeeded in defeating her nomination.

Iannone's interests have gone beyond literature. In her article, "Bryan was right", she wrote that Christians are mistaken when they say that God and Darwinian evolution are compatible.

In recent years she has written increasingly on issues of national identity, criticizing the neoconservative belief that America is an idea rather as a culture.

References

The New York Times, July 14, 1991
Time, July 29, 1991

Year of birth missing (living people)
Living people
National Review people
National Association of Scholars
American literary critics
Women literary critics
American political writers
Female critics of feminism
American women non-fiction writers
21st-century American women